DrayTek is a network equipment manufacturer of broadband CPE (Customer Premises Equipment), including firewalls, VPN devices, routers, managed switches and wireless LAN devices. The company was founded in 1997. The earliest products included ISDN based solutions, the first being the ISDN Vigor128, a USB terminal adaptor for Windows and Mac OS. This was followed by the ISDN Vigor204 ISDN terminal adaptor/PBX and the Vigor2000, its first router. The head office is located in Hsinchu, Taiwan with regional offices and distributors worldwide.

DrayTek's products cover a wide solution range such as firewall, VPN, VoIP, xDSL/broadband devices, and management software to meet the market trend, go above and beyond customers' expectations.

DrayTek was one of the first manufacturers to bring VPN technology to low cost routers, increasing the viability of remote work. In 2004, DrayTek released the first of its VoIP (Voice-Over-IP) products. In 2006, new products for companies debuted, including larger scale firewalls and Unified Threat Management (UTM) firewalls products however the UTM Firewalls did not sell in sufficient volume and the UTM products ceased development and production.

DrayTek's product line offers business and consumer DSL modems with support for the PPPoA standard compared to the more widely supported PPPoE for use with full-featured home routers and home computers without more expensive ATM hardware. PPPoA is used primarily in the UK for ADSL lines. Most Vigor routers provide a virtual private network (VPN) feature, provides LAN-to-LAN and Remote-Dial-In Connections.  In 2011, DrayTek embedded SSL VPN facilities into VigorRouter Series.

DrayTek's Initial Public Offering (IPO) on the Taiwan Stock Exchange occurred in 2004.

March 2021 DrayTek releases new WiFi 6 Access Point to market - DrayTek AP1060C

August 2021 DrayTek announces 2 new WiFi 6 Routers - DrayTek Vigor 2927ax & DrayTek Vigor 2865ax

References

Taiwanese companies established in 1997
Networking hardware companies
Manufacturing companies based in Hsinchu
Manufacturing companies established in 1997
Electronics companies of Taiwan
Taiwanese brands